The Ford Mansion, also known as Washington's Headquarters, is a classic 18th-century American home located at 30 Washington Place in Morristown, New Jersey. It was built by Jacob Ford Jr. in 1774 and is now owned by the National Park Service.

It was acquired by the Washington Association of New Jersey in 1873. The Georgian-styled mansion is known for being George Washington's headquarters from December 1779 to June 1780 during the American Revolutionary War. It was added to the National Register of Historic Places on October 15, 1966 as part of the Morristown National Historical Park.

Architecture
The house has a Georgian-style exterior, but the interior kitchen and framing shows evidence of Dutch influence.  According to Alan Gowan, "the boarding of the Ford Mansion was laid evenly painted and scored to look like a fine masonry with quoins at the corners". The mansion was made with palladian window above the door and a stylish cornice. The fancy architecture was not created to look appealing, but to showcase the wealth of the family who owned the building.

The headmaster's section of the house was built with symmetrical rooms on both side of the foyer.  The office is across from the library and the parlour is across from the dining room.  On the second floor there are symmetrical bedrooms for each side of the hallway. The servant's section of the house was near the kitchen and the pantry on the east side. The grand hall and the parlor are what categorized the house as a mansion.  Unlike most mansions at the time, the Ford Mansion did not use bricks for the exterior, but painted flush board and clapboards.

Location

George Washington and the Continental Army were obliged to set up an encampment in Morristown because of transportation problems. Washington liked Morristown's "defensible terrain, important communication routes, and access to critical resources.".  The Ford family had businesses in iron mines, iron forges, a gristmill, a hemp-mill, and a gunpowder mill that were all stationed near the house.  These businesses were useful to the army in getting resources.

The surrounding community was made up of 250 residents and 70 buildings.  In 1777, many high-ranking officials rented these houses.  Unfortunately, there was an epidemic of smallpox that spread through the town from the soldiers, making the townspeople somewhat bitter to Washington's troops when they arrived in 1779.

Washington's army was stationed at Jockey Hollow while Washington stayed in Ford Mansion.  Jockey Hollow is five miles south of Washington's Headquarters.

Ownership
The Ford Mansion was originally owned by Colonel Jacob Ford Jr.  He was given the deed to the two hundred acres of land by his father in 1762, which was the same year he married Theodosia Johnes. Before serving in the war, Jacob Jr. and his father owned an iron forge in Whippany, New Jersey.

Ford built the house just south of the Whippany River, making it easier to travel to work.

Jacob was the Eastern Battalion Commander of the Morris County Militia. The Western Battalion was commanded by Colonel Jacob Drake.  Ford died from pneumonia on January 11, 1777, in the mansion house. Thirty-five Delaware troops witnessed the death of Jacob Ford Jr.

Before his death, Ford and his soldiers captured a bronze, six-pounder field cannon from the British Army on January 3, 1777, at the victory in Princeton, New Jersey. According to Morristown National Historical Park, "with artillery and arms in short supply, the victory at Princeton not only boosted the morale of the Continental Army, but it bolstered their scant arsenal of weapons.".  Jacob Ford Jr. is noted for his bravery in tours of the Ford Mansion offered by the National Park Service.

The rangers at Morristown National Historical Park advise Jacob Jr. was not at the Battle of Princeton (January 3, 1777).  He was at the Second Battle of Trenton (January 2, 1777) and others and was noted that the militia under his command was allowed to respond to British attacks nearby in conjunction with the Continental Army.  This coordination was not commonplace.  The cannon that was captured at the Battle of Princeton is on display at the museum on the property of the Ford Mansion along with other field guns of the era.

Resistance of 1779–1780

After Ford's death, Mrs. Theodosia Ford gained ownership of the mansion.  According to Pfister, "she was forced to accept a leadership role in the family.  After her husband and father-in-law's death, Mrs. Ford held the family together and kept the farm and family business a profitable endeavor".

Prior to Washington's arrival, the house was considered a "great human tragedy for the Ford family" because in 1777, the house was rented to an overabundance of Continental Army troops that developed smallpox. When Washington arrived, he asked permission from the widow if he could stay in the mansion and paid her for rent.  General Washington, Martha Washington, five aides-de-camp, and 18 servants stayed in the mansion.

Theodosia Ford and her four children occupied two of the four downstairs bedrooms and reserved the kitchen for her own personal use.  Her daughter, Elizabeth Ford, who was 12 when Washington stayed at the mansion, stayed in her mother's room.  During the winter months of 1779 to 1780 she read and learned a total of 25 stitches. Theodosia's boys stayed in another room downstairs. The room featured two doors. One door lead to the servants' side of the house above the pantry and the other door lead to the center hall. The boy's room was more of a recreational room with muskets and Chinese checkers, which is displayed in the Washington's Headquarters Museum at Morristown National Historical Park.  The names of the boys were Jacob, Gabriel, and Timothy Ford.  Jacob was eight, Gabriel was fifteen, and Timothy was seventeen during Washington's stay.

Commander-in-Chief

Washington arrived at Ford mansion in December 1779.  According to Pfister, the mansion was one of the biggest houses in town at that time.  The location was perfect for Washington because the American capital was in Philadelphia and the British Army capital was in Manhattan. It allowed Washington to keep a close eye on the British and enabled him to send letters successfully to the Continental congress.

Washington wrote many letters to congress explaining the poor predicament that his troops were in during his stay at the Ford Mansion.  His place of work was in the private study, which was located on the first floor of the house.  Washington's aides-de-camp worked in the parlor, which became the military office.  These included Alexander Hamilton, Robert H. Harrison, Tench Tilghman, Richard Meade and James McHenry. According to Pfister, the only record of Washington's stay at the mansion was a letter from Richard Meade to Mrs. Ford, dated July 26, 1780.  The letter has been transcribed in the Library of Congress and reads:

Madam: I have received your favour by Captain Tomas Pry. I communicated its contents to His Excellency and am directed to transmit you the inclosed certificate. I have the honour and [the draft is in the writing of and is signed "R.K. Meade, A.D.C.] I certify that the commander in Chief took up his quarters at Mrs. Fords at Morris Town the first day of December 1779, that he left them the 23d of June 1780, and that he occupied two rooms below; all the upper floor, Kitchen, Cellar and Stable. The Stable was built and the two Rooms above Stairs finished at the public expence, and a well, which was intirely useless and filled up before, put in thorough repair by walling & c. Head Quarters near Passaick July 26th. 1780.

Preservation
The Washington Association of New Jersey was founded to preserve the Ford Mansion and its history in Morristown. It purchased the mansion in 1873 and began restoration. A caretaker's cottage was built nearby in 1886. The mansion and grounds were transferred to the National Park Service in 1933.

See also
 New Jersey in the American Revolution
 List of Washington's Headquarters during the Revolutionary War
 List of museums in New Jersey
 List of the oldest buildings in New Jersey
 List of historic sites preserved along Rochambeau's route

References

Bibliography

 Fleming, Thomas. The Forgotten Victory: The Battle For New Jersey – 1780. New York: Reader's Digest Press.
 Gowans, Alan (1964). Architecture in New Jersey: A Record of American Civilization. New Jersey: D. Van Nostrand Company Inc.
 Meade, Richard K. Richard K. Meade to Theodosia Ford Morristown, July 26, 1780, In George Washington Papers at the Library of Congress, 1741–1799, ed. John C. Fitzpatrick (1745–1799).
 Pfister, Jude M. (2009) The Jacob Ford Jr. Mansion. Charleston, South Carolina: The History Press.
 Reidy, Joseph (2008). Washington Headquarters PowerPoint. Morristown, New Jersey: Morristown National Historical Park.
 Szuter, Bob (2009). Morristown: Where American Survived (DVD). Narrated by Edward Herman. Morristown, New Jersey: New Jersey Network.
 Bartenstein, Fred and Isabel (1975). "New Jersey's Revolutionary War Powder Mill". Morris County Historical Society.

External links
 
 
 
 
 

1774 establishments in New Jersey
American Revolutionary War museums in New Jersey
Georgian architecture in New Jersey
Historic house museums in New Jersey
Houses completed in 1774
Houses in Morris County, New Jersey
Morristown National Historical Park
Museums in Morristown, New Jersey
Historic American Buildings Survey in New Jersey
Historic places on the Washington–Rochambeau Revolutionary Route